Wailing With Lou is an album by jazz saxophonist Lou Donaldson released on the Blue Note label in 1957 featuring performances by Donaldson's Quintet with trumpeter Donald Byrd, pianist Herman Foster, bassist  Peck Morrison and drummer Art Taylor.

The Allmusic review by Stephen Thomas Erlewine stated: "There's nothing out of the ordinary here — just hard-driving bop and sensitive ballads, which are sure to please fans of the style".

Track listing
All compositions by Lou Donaldson, except as indicated
 "Caravan" (Duke Ellington, Irving Mills, Juan Tizol) - 5:58
 "Old Folks" (Dedette Lee Hill, Willard Robison) - 6:22
 "That Good Old Feeling" - 6:52
 "Move It" - 5:57
 "There Is No Greater Love" (Isham Jones, Marty Symes) - 6:54
 "L.D. Blues" - 5:18

Personnel
Lou Donaldson - alto saxophone
Donald Byrd - trumpet 
Herman Foster - piano 
Peck Morrison  - bass 
Art Taylor - drums

Production
 Alfred Lion - producer
 Reid Miles - design
 Rudy Van Gelder - engineer
 Francis Wolff - photography

References

Lou Donaldson albums
1957 albums
Blue Note Records albums
Albums produced by Alfred Lion
Albums recorded at Van Gelder Studio